Seattle has a notably large LGBT community, and the city of Seattle has protected gay and lesbian workers since the passage of the Fair Employment Practice Ordinance in 1973. Seattle's LGBT culture has been celebrated at Gay Pride Week which began in 1977. Gay cabaret traveled in a circuit including Seattle and San Francisco since the 1930s. Seattle had gay-friendly clubs and bars since the 1930s including The Casino in Underground Seattle at Pioneer Square which allowed same-sex dancing since 1930, and upstairs from it, The Double Header, in continuous operation since 1933 or 1934 until 2015, was thought to be the oldest gay bar in the United States.

Seattle's gay shopping and recreation area is centered on Capitol Hill with bars, bookstores and other venues.

In 2013, Seattle overtook San Francisco as the United States city with the most households composed of gay or lesbian couples (2.6%), and was the only U.S. city with more than 1% of the households being lesbian couples.

Events

Notable LGBT events in Seattle include the Seattle Lesbian & Gay Film Festival and Seattle Pride.

Media
Seattle Gay News is an LGBT newspaper. Waxie Moon is a documentary about the performer of the same name.

Organizations
Notable LGBT organizations in Seattle include Equal Rights Washington, Gay City Health Project, Gender Justice League, Pride Foundation, the Seattle Men's Chorus, and Lambert House LGBTQ youth center.

The Northwest Network founded by lesbians in 1987 support survivors of abuse and foster empowerment in the LGBT community.

People

Notable drag queens from Seattle include BenDeLaCreme, Bosco, Irene Dubois, Jinkx Monsoon, and Robbie Turner.

Places

Capitol Hill
CC Attle's
Cuff Complex
Diesel
The Double Header
Garden of Allah
Madison Pub
Pike Street
Pony
Queer Bar
Seattle Eagle
Shelly's Leg
The Wildrose
Entre Hermanos

Other LGBT establishments include: Club Z, Crescent Lounge, The Lobby Bar, Neighbours, Purr Cocktail Lounge, and (R Place closed in 2020 due to the covid-19 pandemic and high-rise of rent).

See also
 AIDS Memorial Pathway

References

Sources